Abu Sa'id al-Afif was a Samaritan physician in 15th-century Cairo.

References

Medieval Samaritan people
Physicians from Cairo
15th-century physicians
Medieval Egyptian physicians
Samaritan